The Montreal Alouettes (French: Les Alouettes de Montréal) are a professional Canadian football team based in Montreal, Quebec. Founded in 1946, the team has folded and been revived twice. The Alouettes compete in the East Division of the Canadian Football League (CFL) and last won the Grey Cup championship in 2010. Their home field is Percival Molson Memorial Stadium for the regular season and as of 2014 also home of their playoff games.

The original Alouettes team (1946–1981) won four Grey Cups and were particularly dominant in the 1970s. After their collapse in 1982, they were immediately reconstituted under new ownership as the Montreal Concordes.  After playing for four years as the Concordes, they revived the Alouettes name for the 1986 season. A second folding in 1987 led to a nine-year hiatus of CFL football in the city.

The current Alouettes franchise was established in 1996 by the owners of the Baltimore Stallions. The Stallions were disbanded at the same time as the Alouettes' re-establishment after having been the most successful of the CFL's American expansion franchises, culminating in a Grey Cup championship in 1995. Many players from the Stallions' 1995 roster signed with the Alouettes and formed the core of the team's 1996 roster.

For record-keeping purposes, the CFL considers all clubs that have played in Montreal as one franchise dating to 1946, and considers the Alouettes to have suspended operations in 1987 before returning in 1996. Although the Alouettes' re-establishment in 1996 is often considered a relocation of the Stallions, neither the league nor the Alouettes recognize the Baltimore franchise, or its records, as part of the Alouettes' official team history.

The latest incarnation of the Alouettes were arguably the best CFL team of the 2000s; they took home three Grey Cups in that decade bringing the franchise total to seven. The Alouettes had from 1996 to 2014 the CFL's longest active playoff streak, only having missed the playoffs three times since returning to the league. The streak came to an end in 2015. They have hosted a playoff game every year except 2001, 2007, 2013, and from 2015 to 2018. Their five losing seasons came in 2007, 2013 and from 2015 to 2018. The 2015 through 2018 Alouettes' seasons marked the first time the team missed the playoffs in consecutive years since their re-activation. Major stars of the recent era include Mike Pringle, the CFL career leader in rushing yards, and quarterback Anthony Calvillo, who led all of pro football in career passing yards before Drew Brees took over in late 2020.

In 2019 the CFL purchased the team from American businessman Robert Wetenhall, who could not find a buyer. Later that year the Alouettes were acquired by Crawford Steel executives Sid Spiegel and his son-in-law Gary Stern (through their subsidiary S and S Sportsco), who took over the team on January 6, 2020. In February 2023 the ownership was passed back to the league, which subsequently agreed to sell the team to Quebec media mogul and former Parti Québécois leader Pierre Karl Péladeau in March of that year.

Franchise history

Original Alouettes (1946–1981) 

Canadian football has a long history in Montreal, dating to the 1850s. The Alouettes were first formed in 1946 by Canadian Football Hall of Famer Lew Hayman along with businessmen Eric Cradock and Léo Dandurand. They named themselves after "Alouette", a work song about plucking the feathers from a skylark, which had become a symbol of the Québécois. The origin of the team’s name also comes from the 425 Tactical Fighter Squadron – the Royal Canadian Air Force’s first French Canadian squadron.

They won their first Grey Cup championship in 1949, beating Calgary 28–15 led by quarterback Frank Filchock and running back Virgil Wagner.

The 1950s were a productive decade for the Als, with quarterback Sam Etcheverry throwing passes to John "Red" O'Quinn, "Prince" Hal Patterson, and with Pat Abbruzzi carrying the ball, Montreal fielded the most dangerous offence in all Canadian football. From 1954 to 1956, they reached the Grey Cup in three consecutive seasons, but questionable defensive units led the Alouettes to defeat versus the Edmonton Eskimos each time.

The team was purchased in 1954 by Ted Workman. Like all teams playing in the WIFU and IRFU, the Alouettes joined the newly-formed Canadian Football League in 1958. While the team continued to enjoy success for the rest of the 1950s, that all changed at the end of the 1960 season. To be more specific, the team was shaken by an announcement on November 10 – namely the trade of Hal Patterson and Sam Etcheverry to the Hamilton Tiger-Cats for Bernie Faloney and Don Paquette. Workman had concluded the deal without consulting with general manager Perry Moss. The deal quickly fell apart because Etcheverry had just signed a new contract with a no-trade clause; as a result, Etcheverry was now a free agent. The deal was reworked and Patterson was traded for Paquette. Sam Etcheverry went on to play in the NFL with the St. Louis Cardinals for 2 years (1961 and 1962) followed by the San Francisco 49ers in 1963. Faloney remained in Hamilton, and teamed with Patterson to form one of the most deadly quarterback-receiver combinations in CFL history.

This episode remains one of the most lopsided trades ever made in the Alouettes history, and it ushered in a dark decade for the team.  During that time, they failed to register a single winning season. From 1968 to 1976 the team played in the Autostade stadium—which had been built as a temporary stadium for Expo 67. The stadium's less-than-desirable location on Montreal's waterfront near the Victoria Bridge led to dismal attendance, putting more strain on the team's finances.

The Als finally bottomed out in 1969, finishing 2–12. After that season, Workman sold the team to the highly capable Sam Berger, a former part-owner of the Ottawa Rough Riders. Berger made immediate changes to the team. On December 9, the team announced that Red O'Quinn and Sam Etcheverry were returning to the organization, this time as the team's new general manager and head coach, respectively. The team also unveiled new uniforms—their home jerseys were now predominantly green, with red and white trim. The white helmets with the red "wings" used during the 1960s also disappeared, replaced by a white helmet with a stylized green and red bird's head that formed a lower-case "a". As one might expect from a team that had won only two games in 1969, many new players were brought in.

The changes paid immediate dividends. Although the team finished third in the East, they defeated the Toronto Argonauts and the Hamilton Tiger-Cats in the playoffs. The 1970 season culminated when the Alouettes won the 58th Grey Cup, played on November 28 at Toronto's Exhibition Stadium before a crowd of 32,669. Led by quarterback Sonny Wade (who was named the game's most valuable player, and who would soon become a fan favourite in Montreal—not unlike the status his coach had enjoyed in the 1950s), halfback Moses Denson, receivers Gary Lefebvre and Tom Pullen, along with kicker George Springate, the team defeated the Calgary Stampeders 23–10 for the city's first Grey Cup since 1949, also against the Stamps.

That 1970 victory would herald the beginning of arguably the greatest decade in franchise history. During Berger's tenure as owner, the team played for six Grey Cups and won three (meeting both Alberta teams all of those times, and the Edmonton Eskimos in five of those six games). In 1974, the team changed their colours to match the other Montreal pro sports teams- red, white and blue. They finally moved out of the Autostade and into Olympic Stadium midway through the 1976 season and attendance shot up. In 1977, the Als had a very successful year both on the field and at the box office, winning the Grey Cup at their home field before a Grey Cup-record 68,318 fans (a CFL record that still stands as of 2017). They also averaged 59,595 fans per game at the "Big O" during the regular season, a league record that also still stands.

However, the success ended with Berger's retirement in 1981. He sold the team to Vancouver businessman Nelson Skalbania. The flamboyant Skalbania set about signing two first-round picks from the 1981 National Football League draft and NFL name players such as Vince Ferragamo, James Scott, David Overstreet, Keith Gary and Billy "White Shoes" Johnson. Even with all that talent, the Alouettes suffered on the field, finishing with a dismal 3–13 record while attendance plummeted to under 30,000 per game. However, the East was so weak that year (Hamilton was the only team in the East to finish with a winning record) that they actually made the playoffs, finishing third in the East ahead of the 2–14 Toronto Argonauts. In the East Semi-Final, they made a fairly good showing against the second-place (and eventual East Division champions) Rough Riders before losing by a final score of 20–16.

This would be the last game that the original Alouettes franchise would play.  Skalbania was reported late in 1981 to be selling to oil magnate Pat Bowlen, who would later buy the NFL's Denver Broncos in 1984. Later in 1981, NFL coach George Allen obtained an option to purchase 51% of the club, and was named Alouettes' president. While holding both the option and the post, Allen was surprised by Skalbania arranging a sale of the same controlling stake to Harry Ornest, who would later own the St. Louis Blues and the Toronto Argonauts. Ornest was reluctant to take control of the Alouettes as a result of the team's high level of debt and extensive commitments to high-profile stars. In early April 1982, Allen looked set to take control of the Alouettes. However, Allen left the club in late April after Skalbania was unable to resolve 1981 debts. With the franchise in collapse, Berger tried to force Skalbania to relinquish the team to him as payment for debt. Skalbania returned from a business trip to Hong Kong in late April and was able to regain control of the team. However, Skalbania's highly leveraged business interests collapsed a month later. Unable to meet his obligations, he was forced to return the team to the league on May 13.

Montreal Concordes (1982–1985) 
The CFL had anticipated the collapse of the Alouettes, and was well prepared when Skalbania returned the franchise to the league. Among potential suitors for the troubled franchise was Montreal businessman Charles Bronfman, founder and owner of the Alouettes' co-tenants at the Big O, the Montreal Expos. Bronfman had made it clear to league officials that he would not deal with Skalbania, but would be willing to establish a replacement franchise on short notice if the Alouettes ceased operations. On May 14, 1982, a day after the original Alouettes franchise folded, the CFL granted the Montreal franchise rights to Bronfman. However, Skalbania continued to assert ownership of the Montreal Alouettes name, logos and related intellectual property even though he had given up the franchise.

Rather than risk a lawsuit from the notoriously litigious Skalbania, and unwilling to negotiate with him, Bronfman chose to operate his team under another aviation-inspired name, the Concordes. The new name was not only a reference to the then-revolutionary Concorde supersonic passenger jet, but appeared to be an appeal to both anglophones and francophones, Concorde was an Anglo-French joint venture. Unfortunately, the new name angered management at one of Montreal's most prominent corporations, aviation manufacturer Bombardier. After being a prominent sponsor of the Alouettes, Bombardier refused to have anything to do with a football team named for an aircraft built by one of its competitors, the French-based Aérospatiale.

The Concordes inherited the franchise history and records of the 1946-1981 Alouettes. Bronfman retained most of the Alouettes' coaching staff, including recently hired head coach Joe Galat, and most of the Alouettes' front office personnel. The Concordes also retained the CFL rights of all Alouettes players. In an effort to bring the team's expenses under control, former NFL players signed by Skalbania's Alouettes were released from their contracts. While many players returned to the U.S., one factor working in Bronfman's favour was that a players' strike was looming in the NFL (which would last 57 days from September to November), which helped persuade star quarterback Johnny Evans and a few other Skalbania signees to stay in Montreal.

A nine-game losing streak to end the season doomed the 1982 Concordes to a 2–14 record – the worst record in franchise history (percentage points below the 1969 Als). The Concordes featured quarterback Luc Tousignant, the only Québécois quarterback to start a CFL game besides Gerry Dattilio. The club also featured star collegiate running back David Overstreet (a holdover from the 1981 Alouettes) who rushed for 190 yards in six games before ending his season on the injured reserve list. Other stars on the club included quarterback Johnny Evans, quarterback Turner Gill, slot back Nick Arakgi, running back Lester Brown, wide receiver Brian DeRoo, local kick returner Denny Ferdinand, defensive tackle Glen Weir, safety Preston Young, defensive end Gordon Judges, kicker-punter Don Sweet and linebacker William Hampton.

The team gradually rebounded on the field over the next three years. The Concordes won five games in 1983. While still well below .500, the East Division was so weak that year (only the eventual Grey Cup champion Argos finished with a winning record) that the Concordes were still in playoff contention on the season's final weekend. The Concordes' final game of the season was at Olympic Stadium against the Tiger-Cats. With Hamilton and Montreal tied at 5-10 for the division's third and final playoff spot, a respectable crowd of 41,157 converged to watch the Concordes play what was effectively a playoff game. These fans left heartbroken after Hamilton kicker Bernie Ruoff made a last minute field goal to tie the game 21-21. Since overtime would not be introduced in the CFL regular season until 1986, the Tiger-Cats won the final Eastern playoff berth on account of a better head-to-head record (having beaten the Concordes earlier in the year).

The team returned to the playoffs in 1984, again doing so in a weak East Division; only the defending champion Argos finished with a winning record. In 1985, they advanced all the way to the East Final. Their East Semifinal win over Ottawa that year was both their only home playoff game and only playoff win under the Concordes banner; 1984 and 1985 were the only playoff appearances for a Montreal football team from 1982 to 1986. However, as in 1984, they made the playoffs in an extremely weak East Division; the Concordes and Ti-Cats both finished with identical 8-8 records, with the Ti-Cats getting the division title by virtue of sweeping the season series. No other team in the division even managed a .500 record.

However, attendance did not keep pace with the team's performance. The Concordes' 1983 season finale against Hamilton was the only game to attract a crowd surpassing even 30,000 under Bronfman's ownership. Moreover, the 1985 East Semifinal was a disaster at the box office due in part to poor weather conditions and haphazard facility preparations. Only 11,372 fans attended what would turn out to be the team's last home game played under the Concordes name.

Re-branding and demise (1986–1987) 
After quietly coming to terms with Skalbania, in 1986 the team attempted to embrace its predecessor's history and regenerate flagging fan interest by rebranding itself the "new" Montreal Alouettes. This would not prove to be successful, on or off the field. On the field, the team posted a 4–14 record, missing the playoffs in spite of once again finishing third in the East on account of the new "cross-over rule" the CFL had implemented for the 1986 season. Off the field, financial losses mounted and the team's attendance tumbled to 10,127 a game, including only 9,045 at their final home game (a contest against the BC Lions drew only 5200 fans, the smallest crowd at any CFL game since 1951).

Just before the 1987 season, Carling O'Keefe tore up its deal to serve as the CFL's presenting television sponsor. The collapse of the CFL's television deal proved a death blow for the Alouettes. The franchise had lost at least $15 million under Bronfman's ownership. While Bronfman was far better-financed than Skalbania, he was unwilling to spend millions of dollars underwriting his professional sports holdings indefinitely. Bronfman's overall situation was not helped by the then-emerging news that his other professional sports team, the Expos, were at the centre of a massive collusion scandal that was rocking Major League Baseball. Eventually, Bronfman decided to focus on baseball and made it clear he would not field a football team for the 1987 CFL season unless the Alouettes sold thousands of additional season tickets. Neither the necessary season ticket sales nor a viable ownership group willing to take the franchise off Bronfman's hands materialized. Re-location was not an option either; although several Canadian cities had expressed interest in acquiring a CFL team, none of the prospective candidates were even potentially large enough to support a team, or had a stadium that was suitable even for temporary use. At the time, the CFL was lukewarm to the possibility of expanding or re-locating to U.S. markets (the CFL's U.S. expansion did not come until six years later).

The new Alouettes folded on June 24, 1987, just a day before the 1987 regular season started. The league had already prepared for this, and immediately released a previously-drafted eight-team schedule. However, the Alouettes' demise came so late that the June 28 Washington Post still announced an ESPN broadcast of an Alouettes–Stampeders game, a game that would never be played. The team did play both of its two preseason games on the road before folding. To balance out the divisions, the easternmost-West Division team, the Winnipeg Blue Bombers, moved to the East Division to take the Alouettes' place (along with this, the "cross-over rule" for the playoffs was scrapped until 1997). The CFL held a dispersal draft for the Alouettes players. Some of the players left out of work by the team's demise (both on the Alouettes and players on other CFL teams who were cut to make room for former Alouettes) played in the NFL as replacement players during another players' strike later that year. During the period that the Alouettes were inactive, professional gridiron football would return to Montreal in the form of the World League of American Football's Montreal Machine, who played two seasons in 1991 and 1992 under American rules.

Baltimore Stallions (1994–1995)

The Baltimore Football Club was granted an expansion franchise for 1994 by the Canadian Football League during their American expansion of the early-mid 1990s. After the NFL's Indianapolis Colts (who had moved from Baltimore in 1983) blocked attempts to name the new team the Baltimore CFL Colts, owner Jim Speros eventually settled on Stallions as a nickname. The Stallions were by far the most successful of the CFL's American teams, garnering strong fan support in the Baltimore area and appearing in the Grey Cup in both its seasons, losing in 1994 and winning in 1995. To date, they are the only American-based team to play for and win the Grey Cup. Only a week before the Stallions won the Grey Cup, Cleveland Browns owner Art Modell announced his intention to relocate his NFL club to Baltimore.  Support for the Stallions dried up almost overnight. Speros knew the Stallions could not even begin to compete with an NFL team. Rather than face being effectively reduced to "minor-league" status in Baltimore, Speros decided to move the Stallions elsewhere.

At one point, Speros was very close to moving the team to Houston, Texas. Although Houston at the time was still home to the NFL's Oilers, fan support for that team had collapsed due their pending relocation to Nashville (to later become the Titans). Speros had reason to believe a CFL team there could repeat the success that had been enjoyed in Baltimore. In addition, a team in Houston would have been natural rivals for the San Antonio Texans, who were still planning to play the 1996 season had at least one other U.S. team survived. On the other hand, the proposed move to Houston was considered in some circles to be little more than a ploy to win concessions from the NFL, which presumably would not have wanted to risk the embarrassment of having one of its teams outdrawn by a team from another league in the same city. The NFL would return to Houston in 2002 in the form of the Texans.

In the end, under prodding from league commissioner and former Alouettes running back Larry Smith, Speros began talks with Montreal. Smith had been looking for a way to return the CFL to Canada's second-largest market and, at the same time, find a way out of the failing American expansion (which Smith had also presided over). He believed that the defending Grey Cup champions would be a better vehicle for reviving football in Montreal than what would have effectively been an expansion team.

At a league meeting on February 2, 1996; Speros formally requested permission to move the Stallions to Montreal.  The request was granted, officially ending the CFL's American experiment.  However, talks had been so far advanced that at least one Baltimore outlet reported that the Stallions were moving to Montreal in January.  According to at least one Canadian outlet, at the same time Speros had already begun deciding whether to retain the Stallions moniker or "revive" the Alouettes.  He ultimately chose the latter course, reconstituting his organisation as the third incarnation of the Alouettes. While Speros was able to reclaim the history of the 1946–86 Alouettes/Concordes franchise, he was not allowed to retain the history of the Stallions. As a result, according to official CFL records, Speros is now reckoned as having surrendered the Stallions franchise before "reactivating" the Alouettes franchise. The Alouettes are now retconned as having suspended operations from 1987 to 1995, while the Stallions are officially one of only three modern-era Grey Cup champions to fold (after the Rough Riders and the original Alouettes). The Alouettes, however, do briefly mention the Stallions on their history page.

While all of the Stallions players were released from their contracts, general manager Jim Popp, who followed the team from Baltimore, was able to re-sign many of them. However, as with all the other U.S.-based CFL teams, the Stallions had been exempt from CFL rules that mandated a certain quota of Canadian "non-import" players on team rosters.  For this reason, an expansion draft was held to help stock the Alouettes with the required number of Canadian players.  Popp hired former Stallions assistant coach Bob Price to be the new head coach of the revived Alouettes. With the help of much of the core of the Stallions, the Alouettes were able to overcome a slow start to finish with their first winning record since 1979. They defeated the Hamilton Tiger-Cats in the East semifinal before being defeated by the Argos 43–7 in the East Final.

In 1997, Speros sold the team to developer and investor Robert Wetenhall, who owned the team until he officially transferred ownership to the league on May 31, 2019. Smith stepped down as league commissioner and became president of the Alouettes. Bob Price left the Alouettes to head south and coach in the NCAA. Popp hired former B.C. Lions head coach and Concordes defensive line coach Dave Ritchie as his successor.

Rebirth of the Montreal Alouettes (1996–1997) 
The revived Alouettes franchise played their first two seasons at Olympic Stadium, but attendance in the cavernous domed stadium was very poor at first. The future of the franchise was very much in doubt until a twist of fate revitalized the floundering club.  When a scheduled November 1997 U2 concert at Olympic Stadium conflicted with an unexpected home playoff game against the Lions (due to the CFL's recently re-established 'cross-over' playoff rule), the team decided to move the game to Molson Stadium, where they had played from 1954 to 1967. Interest in the team soared and the game was sold out, prompting the team to relocate permanently to the smaller venue beginning with the 1998 season. At the time of the Alouettes' return to Molson, the stadium's capacity was 20,202.  Prior to every Sunday home game, the club plays "Sunday Bloody Sunday" over the PA system in tribute to the unintended role U2 played in saving the franchise.  The team did not completely abandon the Olympic Stadium, and used it for one home game per year, from 2001 to 2009, and playoff games from 2001-2012. The Montreal Alouettes got off to a good start, winning 25 games and losing 11 in their first two seasons, and reaching the East Division Finals both times.

Anthony Calvillo era (1998–2013) 
The fortunes for the Alouettes started to change during the 1998 season, when they acquired a young free agent quarterback from the Hamilton Tiger-Cats, Anthony Calvillo, and they drafted slotback Ben Cahoon. Tracy Ham and Mike Pringle led the team to a second-place finish, but they suffered a last-second loss to the Hamilton Tiger-Cats in the East Final. The Alouettes finally broke through in 1999, under new head coach Charlie Taaffe, winning their first division title since 1979. However, for the fourth consecutive season they lost the East Final match in a close game against the Tiger-Cats, 27–26.

Tracy Ham retired after the 1999 season, and Anthony Calvillo took over as the full-time starting quarterback, he led the team to their first Grey Cup final since 1979, losing to BC in a close game, as they came within a missed two point convert of sending the game into overtime. After the season Charlie Taaffe resigned to become the head coach of  the Maryland Terrapins. The next season started under new coach Rod Rust at 9–2, but after Calvillo separated his shoulder, the team started struggling and after losing all their remaining games, GM Jim Popp fired Rust, led them into the playoffs, where they lost to the Hamilton Tiger-Cats in the East Semi-Final.

During the off-season, the Alouettes signed Don Matthews to lead the team in the future. They came all the way back in 2002, finishing with the best record (13-5) in the CFL and winning their first Grey Cup since 1977, by defeating one of their oldest rivals, and Matthews' former team, the Edmonton Eskimos, 25–16. The Alouettes had the best record in the CFL during the 2004 season at 14–4 and looked liked a sure bet to play for the Grey Cup, but in the East Final, Anthony Calvillo got hurt, and was replaced by backup Ted White, and the Toronto Argonauts rallied to defeat the Alouettes, 26–18. During the 2004-2005 off-season, all time CFL career rushing yards leader Mike Pringle signed a one-day contract, so he could retire as a member of the Montreal Alouettes. The team participated in the first Grey Cup overtime game in almost 50 years. The Edmonton Eskimos defeated the Alouettes, 38–35.

During the 2006 season Matthews left his position as head coach near the end of the season because of health reasons, and Jim Popp took over for the rest of the season, leading the team to the Grey Cup, where they lost 25–14 to the B.C Lions.

Popp stayed on to coach the team during the 2007 season, and the team suffered its first losing season since coming back to Montreal in 1996, with an 8–10 record, hindered by the loss of starting quarterback Anthony Calvillo, who left the team near the end of the season to be with his wife who was sick. The team lost the East Semi-Final, 24-22, to the Winnipeg Blue Bombers with backup quarterback Marcus Brady behind center. With Montreal hosting the 2008 Grey Cup, the Alouettes wanted to be there, so they hired an experienced NFL assistant coach in Marc Trestman, and head coach Trestman helped lead them to an 11–7 record and a berth in the Grey Cup against the visiting Calgary Stampeders led by Henry Burris. The Stampeders defeated the hometown Montreal Alouettes, 22–14, in front of over 66,000 fans.

The 2009 season was a record breaking season for the Montreal Alouettes, as they set a team record for wins in a regular season, were a CFL best 15–3, and their defence was amazing, as they allowed only 324 points, second least in an 18-game season. Marc Trestman won the coach of the year. The Alouettes earned a 28–27 comeback victory in the 2009 Grey Cup, thanks to the great play of Anthony Calvillo, Ben Cahoon, and Jamel Richardson. The Alouettes trailed the Saskatchewan Roughriders, 27–11, with 8 minutes to play in the game, when they started their comeback. It all came down to the foot of field goal kicker Damon Duval, who after missing a 43-yard field on the last play, got a second chance, when the Roughriders were called for having too many players on the field (The 13th Man), which was a ten-yard penalty, so kicking from the 33 yard line, Duval nailed it through the uprights, giving Montreal an improbable Grey Cup victory, after trailing the entire game. The game turned into a Grey Cup classic, thanks to the great play of the Alouettes veterans, and broke a streak of 4 straight losses in Grey Cups. The 2010 season was another good season for Montreal, as they went 12–6 and became the first team since the 1997 Toronto Argonauts to repeat as Grey Cup Champions. They played against the Saskatchewan Roughriders for the second straight year, and won the game, 21–18, repeating as champs.

The 2011 season was another record breaking year for Anthony Calvillo, as he broke numerous records, all against the Argonauts. During their first meeting Calvillo broke the CFL all time touchdown passes record of 394 TD passes on a pass to Eric Deslauriers, Damon Allen was at the game at Molson Stadium and personally congratulated him on breaking his record. He tied Allen's record in Regina the week before with the only touchdown pass ever caught by Tim Maypray. During the teams' second meeting, he broke the completions record with a completion to Brandon London. In the teams' third meeting, Anthony Calvillo became pro football's all-time career passing yards leader, on a Jamel Richardson touchdown pass to end the third quarter. The play was stopped as his family joined him along with Mark Cohan for a special on field presentation and video tribute. NFL greats Warren Moon and Dan Marino, ESPN's Chris Berman, and Damon Allen each sent video messages congratulating him on breaking the record. Calvillo was presented with a special plaque, with the number 72382, the new pro football all-time yardage mark. The team lost an overtime thriller in the East Semi-Final at the Olympic Stadium 52–44 to the Hamilton Tiger-Cats.

The 2012 season was another good year for the Alouettes, but after an 11–7 season they lost the East final to the Toronto Argonauts after Brian Bratton dropped a game-tying touchdown pass from Calvillo with a minute left in the game, giving Toronto a 27–20 win.

Before the 2013 season coach Marc Trestman left the Alouettes for the NFL, becoming the head coach of the Chicago Bears. Jim Popp went looking for a new coach, but he chose an inexperienced coach in Dan Hawkins who had no pro experience. After trying to change the playbook, and upsetting a lot of the players, especially Anthony Calvillo, and a dismal 2–3 record, Jim Popp fired Hawkins, and coached the team for the rest of the year. Calvillo was not having a great year, when he suffered a season-ending concussion in Saskatchewan on a hit by Ricky Foley. Jim Popp went looking for a quarterback for the future, and it looked like he found it, in Heisman Trophy winner Troy Smith. Both Tanner Marsh and Josh Neiswander led the Alouettes to comeback wins during the year, but when Troy Smith took over, he looked more poised and comfortable than the others. The team had an 8–10 record, and still made the playoffs for an 18th straight year. Troy Smith might have led them to a surprising playoff run, if the referees had called pass interference on a possible game winning pass to Duron Carter in the last minute of play, of the East Semi-Final against the Tiger-Cats.

Anthony Calvillo announced his retirement on January 21, after a 20-year career, including the last 16 with the Alouettes.

Post-Anthony Calvillo era (2014–2018) 

On February 24, 2014, the Alouettes named former Edmonton Eskimos and Calgary Stampeders coach Tom Higgins as the 21st head coach in franchise history. Higgins coached the Eskimos against the Alouettes in both the 90th and 91st Grey Cup games. The Alouettes finished with a .500 record, qualifying for the playoffs. After dismantling the BC Lions in a crossover match the Alouettes were beaten by the Tiger-Cats 40-24.

On May 22, 2015, Michael Sam signed a two-year contract with the Alouettes. The signing made him the first openly gay player in the CFL's history. Michael Sam left the team after dressing for one game. On August 21, 2015, owner Robert Wettenhall announced he had relieved Tom Higgins of his head coaching responsibilities and that general manager Jim Popp would take over the duties of head coach.  The 2015 season was a difficult one for the Alouettes, due to injuries to starting QB Jonathan Crompton, the Alouettes went through five different quarterbacks including two rookies Rakeem Cato, and Brandon Bridge, before trading for veteran Kevin Glenn. By that time the quarterback shuffle had taken its toll on the team and they finished the year with a 6–12 record and missed the playoffs for the first time since both 1986 and their 1996 re-activation, their last year before folding on the eve of the 1987 season.

The following season on September 19, 2016, Popp was relieved of his coaching duties, while remaining as the team's general manager. Jacques Chapdelaine was named interim head coach, becoming the first Quebec-born head coach in Alouettes' history. He was named the permanent coach on December 13, 2016. Kavis Reed took over duties as the team's new general manager. 2016 was also another dismal year for the team, finishing with another losing record of 7-11. After a 3-8 start to the 2017 season, Chapdelaine was fired on September 13, 2017. The Alouettes ended the season with their worst record since reactivation, 3-15.

On December 20, 2017, former Green Bay Packers head coach Mike Sherman was named the team's new head coach. Under Sherman the team suffered its fourth consecutive losing season, finishing the year with 5 wins and 13 losses. In the five seasons following Anthony Calvillo's retirement, the team won 30 games and lost 60.

Spiegel and Stern ownership, rebranding (2019–2023)
On February 1, 2019, the team unveiled a new logo and updated uniforms, designed by GRDN Studio, replacing the previous "angry bird" logo used since the team's reestablishment in 1996 with a stylized "M", designed to resemble a bird and plane, and introducing a new "MontreALS" tagline, playing upon the team's nickname. The team also partnered with Vice Media on aspects of accompanying marketing and content.

On May 31, 2019, Wetenhall surrendered his ownership of the Alouettes to the league, after having attempted to pursue a sale. The CFL would operate the team on its behalf while it searched for a new owner. Several prospective suitors for the team included Clifford Starke, a 35-year-old entrepreneur in medical cannabis who is friends with former Alouette player and CFL commissioner Larry Smith, who had been negotiating for a majority stake. Also interested was former Alouettes running back Eric Lapointe, whose 2017 bid had been rejected but has maintained interest in buying the team (though he withdrew in April 2019), and Vincenzo Guzzo, CEO of Quebec's Cinémas Guzzo cinema chain. As of early June, CFL sources indicated it would not accept Starke's bid, while Guzzo's was said to be on hold. Guzzo later stated that he was displeased with the state of the Alouettes organization as a business and that, had he not been a Montreal resident, he would have never considered buying the team.

On June 8 - two days after their last pre-season game, and just six days before their 2019 season opener, Khari Jones took over from Mike Sherman as interim head coach. Jones guided the Alouettes to a 10–8 record, good for a second-place finish in the East Division, and the team's first playoff berth since 2014. The Alouettes improved play during that season was also attributable to the performance of their quarterback Vernon Adams who passed for almost 4,000 yards. Although the team lost in the East Semi-Final to the crossover Edmonton Eskimos 37–29, the team removed the interim tag from Jones' head coach title, and he was signed to a three-year extension on November 26, 2019. 

On January 6, 2020, after almost a year of being owned by the league, the Alouettes found new ownership in Crawford Steel's Sid Spiegel and his father-in-law Gary Stern, whose holding company S and S Sportsco would oversee the team. Spiegel died on July 28, 2021, before being able to see the team he bought play a game (the 2020 season was cancelled due to the COVID-19 pandemic); in effect, the team was controlled by his estate. On August 29, 2022 Gary Stern announced that he was stepping away from day-to-day operations with the club and resigning from his role with the Canadian Football League’s board of governors, effective immediately.

Pierre Karl Péladeau ownership era (2023–present) 
On February 14, 2023, the ownership of the Alouettes was transferred back to the CFL. Mario Cecchini was appointed as the interim President while the league sought to finalize a sale to new ownership. On March 10, 2023, the CFL announced that Pierre Karl Péladeau had purchased the team.

Current roster

Current coaching staff

Television and radio
The Alouettes' English radio network is fronted by Bell Media's CKGM, while Cogeco's CHMP is the French-language flagship.

Games are also heard on Sirius XM Canada and their French service Influence Franco (XM 174) and Attitude Franco (Sirius 164).

The Alouettes' main television coverage is fronted by TSN and French sister network RDS.

Players of note

Retired numbers

Canadian Football Hall of Fame

Head coaches
 Lew Hayman (1946–1951)
 Peahead Walker (1952–1959)
 Perry Moss (1960–1962)
 Jim Trimble (1963–1965)
 Darrell Mudra (1966)
 Kay Dalton (1967–1969)
 Sam Etcheverry (1970–1972)
 Marv Levy (1973–1977)
 Joe Scannella (1978–1981)
 Jim Eddy (1981)
 Joe Galat (1982–1985)
 Gary Durchik (1985–1986)
 Joe Faragalli (1987 - was named head coach but the Alouettes folded before their 1987 regular season started)
 Bob Price (1996)
 Dave Ritchie (1997–1998)
 Charlie Taaffe (1999–2000)
 Rod Rust (2001)
 Jim Popp (2001, 2006–2007, 2013, 2015–2016)
 Don Matthews (2002–2006)
 Marc Trestman (2008–2012)
 Dan Hawkins (2013)
 Tom Higgins (2014–2015)
 Jacques Chapdelaine (2016–2017)
 Kavis Reed (2017)
 Mike Sherman (2018)
 Khari Jones (2019–2022)
 Danny Maciocia (2022)
 Jason Maas (2023–present)

General managers
 Lew Hayman (1946–1954)
 Vic Obeck (1955–1956)
 Gorman Kennedy (1957–1959)
 Perry Moss (1960–1962)
 Jim Trimble (1963–1964)
 Ted Workman (1965–1967)
 Tony Golab (1968–1969)
 Red O'Quinn (1970–1971)
 J. I. Albrecht (1972–1973)
 Bob Geary (1974–1981)
 Sam Etcheverry (1982–1983)
 Joe Galat (1983–1986)
 Norm Kimball (1986)
 Jim Popp (1996–2016)
 Kavis Reed (2016–2019)
 Danny Maciocia (2020–present)

Mascots
Touché is the mascot for the Montreal Alouettes. The team introduced a second mascot in 1999 named Blitz, but Blitz was discontinued at the start of the 2013 season.

See also
 Montreal Alouettes all time records and statistics
 Canadian Football Hall of Fame
 Montreal Machine
 List of Montreal Alouettes seasons

References

External links
 Official website, English

 
Canadian Football League teams
Al
Sports clubs established in 1946
1946 establishments in Quebec